Monseigneur Jean Cadilhac (1931 – 27 October 1999) was the Bishop of Nimes, France.

Life

Cadilhac was born in 1931 at Fraisse-Cabardès and studied at the Collège Saint Théodard where he finished 6th in his class. He continued his classical studies at the Petit Séminaire of Montauban from 1949 to 1955. He was ordained a priest for the Diocese of Montauban on 29 June 1955 and appointed Auxiliary Bishop of Avignon and Titular Bishop of Segermes in September 1973.
He was made Bishop of Nîmes  in March 1978 and he died  27 October 1999.
Throughout his career he was a chaplin to the Rural Movement of Christian Youth.

Written works
 Notes Pastorales de Monseigneur Jean Cadilhac 1978-1998 (Broché – 1998)

See also
Catholic Church in France

References

1931 births
1999 deaths
Bishops of Nîmes
20th-century Roman Catholic bishops in France